Theerawat Pinpradub (born 11 July 1984) is a professional footballer from Thailand. He currently plays for Udon Thani in the Thai League 2.

Honours

Club
Muangthong United
 Thailand Premier League Champions (1) : 2010

References
http://pattayautd.com/webboard/index.php?topic=3800.0

1984 births
Living people
Theerawat Pinpradub
Association football goalkeepers
Theerawat Pinpradub
Theerawat Pinpradub
Theerawat Pinpradub
Theerawat Pinpradub
Theerawat Pinpradub
Theerawat Pinpradub
Theerawat Pinpradub
Theerawat Pinpradub
Theerawat Pinpradub
Theerawat Pinpradub
Theerawat Pinpradub
Theerawat Pinpradub
Theerawat Pinpradub
Theerawat Pinpradub
Theerawat Pinpradub